Quantum Field Theory in a Nutshell is a textbook by Anthony Zee covering quantum field theory. The book has been adopted by many universities, including Harvard University, Princeton University, the University of California, Berkeley, the California Institute of Technology, Columbia University, Stanford University, and Brown University, among others.

Response 
Stephen Barr said about the book, "Like the famous Feynman Lectures on Physics, this book has the flavor of a good blackboard lecture". Michael Peskin's review in Classical and Quantum Gravity said, "This is quantum field theory taught at the knee of an eccentric uncle; one who loves the grandeur of his subject, has a keen eye for a slick argument, and is eager to share his repertoire of anecdotes about Feynman, Fermi, and all of his heroes [...] This [book] can help [students] love the subject and race to its frontier". David Tong called it a "charming book, where emphasis is placed on physical understanding and the author isn’t afraid to hide the ugly truth when necessary. It contains many gems". Zvi Bern wrote, "Zee has an infectious enthusiasm and a remarkable talent for slicing through technical mumbo jumbo to arrive at the heart of a problem".

References 

Physics textbooks
Quantum field theory